Sri Radha Krishna-chandra Temple is one of the largest Krishna-Hindu temples in the world. It is situated in Bangalore in the Indian state of Karnataka. The temple is dedicated to Hindu deities Radha Krishna and propagates Monotehism as mentioned in Chandogya Upanishad.

History
In May 1997, Bangalore ISKCON Temple was inaugurated by the ninth president of India—Shankar Dayal Sharma.

About temple

Features of the temple

There is a gold-plated dhwaja-stambha (flag post) 17 m (56 ft) high and a gold plated kalash shikhara 8.5 m (28 ft) high. There is free distribution of Sri Krishna prasadam to all visitors during the darshana hours.

Shrines (altars)
ISKCON Bangalore has six shrines:

 Main deities is of Radha-Krishna
 Krishna Balrama
 Nitai Gauranga (Chaitanya Mahaprabhu and Nityananda)
 Srinivasa Govinda (also known as Venkateswara)
 Prahlada Narasimha
 Srila Prabhupada

Darshan timings
The temple is open from 4:30 a.m. to 5:00 am. The day begins with a Grand arati ceremony called mangala-arati followed by worship of Tulasi Devi, Sri Narasimha Arati and Suprabhata Seva for Sri Srinivasa Govinda. The temple again opens at 7:15 a.m. for Shringara Darshana Arati. 5:15 a.m. to 7:15 a.m.: Japa Meditation session. The temple remains open until 1:00 p.m. In the evening the temple is open from 4:15 to 8:15. During weekends and public holidays Temple timings are 4:30 a.m. to 5:00 a.m. and 7:00 a.m. to 8:30 p.m. without any break in the afternoon. The evening arati starts at 7:00 where devotees sing kirtan. In the main temple the arati is performed by three priests. This arati is followed again by kirtan where devotees can be seen dancing to the rhythm of "Hare Krishna Hare Rama".

Festivals
ISKCON Bangalore celebrates festivals that are either related to avatars of Lord Vishnu or with Vedic culture. Main festivals that are celebrated within the temple are:
Rama Navami
Brahmotsava
Narasimha Jayanti
Panihati Chida-dahi
Ratha Yatra
Balaram Jayanti
Jhulan Utsav
Sri Krishna Janmashtami
Swagatam Krishna
Vyasa Puja
Sri Radhashtami
Deepotsava
Govardhan Puja
Vaikuntha Ekadashi
Nityananda Trayodashi 
Gaura Poornima
Krishna Shringar
Kumbhabhisheka

Social services

ISKCON Bangalore provides free food to those in need. The Akshaya Patra Foundation is one initiative started by members of the temple, which has received praise from United States President Barack Obama for feeding and educating children across India. A TV documentary has also been made on Akshaya Patra Foundation

The Akshaya Patra Foundation is principally involved in implementing the Mid-Day Meal programme to the children in Government and Government-aided schools across India. It follows a Public-Private Partnership model of operation, and hence has been working in partnership with the Central and State Governments. It was set up in the year 2000 and runs the world's largest NGO-run Mid-Day Meal Programme. Akshaya Patra is currently operating in 27 locations across 11 states of India. It is reaching out to over 13,500 Government and Government-aided schools feeding 1.6 million children every day.

Gallery

See also
ISKCON Vrindavan
ISKCON Temple Chennai
ISKCON Temple Delhi
ISKCON Temple, Visakhapatnam
ISKCON Temple Thrissur

References

External links

ISKCON Temple Bangalore official website
ಇಸ್ಕಾನ್ ಬೆಂಗಳೂರು (ಕನ್ನಡ)
ISKCON Revival Movement official website
The journal of the Hare Krishna Movement
A Worldwide Community of Devotees of Lord Sri Krishna
ISKCON cow protection
Hare Krishna website
ISKCON Telegram channel

Hindu temples in Bangalore
Radha Krishna temples
Tourist attractions in Bangalore